Roland Lamar Williams (born April 27, 1975), is a former American football tight end. He played for Syracuse University, and played professionally for eight years in the National Football League (NFL).

Youth and college
Roland Williams was born in Rochester, New York and grew up in a challenging neighborhood. Roland attended Syracuse University and became the first person in his immediate family to graduate from a four-year college.

Playing career
Roland Williams was selected in the 1998 National Football League Draft by the Saint Louis Rams and played professionally for eight years at the tight end position. Highlights include the 2002 American Football Conference Championship and the St. Louis Rams' Super Bowl XXXIV Championship in which Williams made one reception for a gain of nine yards.

Following his stint with the Rams, Roland played three years for the Oakland Raiders. The Raiders won the American Football Conference Championship in the 2002-2003 season. In 2003, Roland played one season with the Tampa Bay Buccaneers. In 2004, Roland returned to play another season with the Oakland Raiders and then the subsequent season with the St. Louis Rams before a career ending knee injury sidelined him in 2006.

Other work and activities
Roland was nominated for the Walter Payton NFL Man of the Year Award for philanthropy and citizenship.  In 2015, Roland started the Champion Academy Extreme Mentoring & Empowerment Initiative, a mentoring program in his hometown of Rochester, New York to help at-risk middle and high school students improve as students and citizens.

Since his retirement as a player, Roland Williams has worked as a television/radio sports analyst and keynote speaker.  As a sports analyst for more than a decade, Roland has appeared on media outlets including CBS Sports Network, ESPN, MTV, NBC, NBC Sports Network, Nickelodeon, NFL Network, CNBC, Fox, Fox Sports Net, CBS and ABC. He has contributed on radio, online and in print publications.  In 2008, he coached a high school student aiming to become a football player on the MTV show "Made."

References

1975 births
Living people
Sportspeople from Rochester, New York
American football tight ends
Syracuse Orange football players
St. Louis Rams players
Oakland Raiders players
Tampa Bay Buccaneers players